Sinotherium ("Chinese Beast") is a genus of single-horned elasmotheriine rhinoceros that lived from the late Miocene (Tortonian - Messinian) to Early Pliocene. It was ancestral to Elasmotherium, demonstrating a very important evolutionary transition from nasal-horned elasmotheriines to frontal-horned elasmotheriines. Its fossils have been found in the Karabulak Formation of Kazakhstan, lower jaw and teeth have been found in Mongolia, and a partial skull is known from the upper part of the Liushu Formation of western China.
Sinotherium diverged from the ancestral genus, Iranotherium, first found in Iran, during the early Pliocene. Some experts prefer to lump Sinotherium, and Iranotherium into Elasmotherium.

Discovery, History and Taxonomy

Species 
The type species of Sinotherium is S. lagrelii. It is also known to have an additional species from the Zaisan depression of Kazakhstan called S. zaisanensis, however, doubt has been raised on its validity.<ref name="bayshashov1986"/

Discovery 
Finds of Sinotherium are rather rare and often only fragmentary. The first fossils, which also led to the description of the rhinoceros genus, came to light at the beginning of the 20th century and were discovered by JG Andersson in the Baode district in the Chinese province of Shanxi in deposits from the Upper Miocene. These mainly consisted of isolated teeth, but also an upper jaw fragment with the preserved row of teeth from the second premolar to the penultimate molar and a lower jaw fragment.<ref name="ringstrom1923"/<ref name="ringstrom1924"/ From north-western Mongolia near Chono-Khariakha, a 72 cm long, well-preserved lower jaw was discovered which dates to the Lower Pliocene.<ref name="kondrashov2000"/ Other individual finds are known from Kazakhstan, including a rear part of the skull with part of the teeth and several skeletal elements of the body. The most complete skull to date was found in the upper area of the Liushu Formation near Houaigou in the Guanghe District of Gansu Province. The Liushu Formation is about 100 m thick and over wide ranges of Linxia basin digested. This section is dated to about 7 to 6.4 million years and thus belongs to the end of the Miocene. The geological deposits of the Linxia Basin have already produced numerous well-preserved fossil rhinoceros remains, including numerous representatives of the Elasmotheria. Only the part of the snout is missing from the skull and it provided evidence of the location of the horns in Sinotherium.

Description

Skull and Horn 
The horns of older elasmotheriines are present on their nasals (nose), whereas the horn of Sinotherium's descendant Elasmotherium is present on its frontals (forehead), Sinotherium shows a unique condition in which its horn is present in an intermediate "naso-frontal" position. This represents the horn shifting from its ancestral nasal position to the derived frontal position, eventually resulting in the completely frontal restricted position of Elasmotherium.

In addition to the nasofrontal horn, Sinotherium also preserves a rugosity on its forehead, just behind the nasofrontal horn, which implies that the animal had two horns.

Paleobiology

Evolution 
Early elasmotheriine genera of the line leading to Elasmotherium, have a dolichocephalic skull supporting a horn growing on their nose, just like any other Rhinocerotid, however, Elasmotherium was the sole member of Elasmotheriinae that had a brachycephalic skull and supported a horn on its forehead instead. A transition between this state of nose-horned to forehead-horned elasmotheriines remained missing until 2012, when the first cranial remains of Sinotherium lagrelii, (specimen IVPP V 18539, a partial skull housed at the Institute of Vertebrate Paleontology and Paleoanthropology, Chinese Academy of Sciences in Beijing) was described, demonstrating a very important transition from nose-horned elasmotheriines like Ningxiatherium to forehead-horned elasmotheriines like Elasmotherium.

While the horns of Ningxiatherium-like elasmotheriines are present on their nasals, and the horn of Elasmotherium on its frontals, Sinotherium shows its horn to be present in a "nasofrontal" position, (present on both the nose and the forehead). This shows the horn shifting from its ancestral nasal position to a more derived frontal position, eventually resulting in the completely frontal restricted position of Elasmotherium.

Distribution and Paleoecology 
Sinotherium first appeared during the Late Miocene, occupying east Asian and Mid-Asian regions, but remains dating to the Early Pliocene can be found from eastern Asia to as far as the Kumo-Manych depression of South-Western Russia. This showed that at the beginning of the Pliocene (5.3–4.8 Mya), Sinotherium had significantly expanded its range westward.
Sinotherium is known from Pliocene to Late Miocene deposits of Kazakhstan, Mongolia, and China.

In China, the species S. lagrelii is known from an age of 7 Ma from the red clays of the Late Miocene Liushu Formation in the Linxia Basin, Gansu Province, accompanying one bear (Ursavus sp.), one badger-like mustelid (Parataxidea sinensis), three hyenas (Hyaenictitherium wongii, H. hyaenoides, and Ictitherium sp.), three felids (Amphimachairodus giganteus, Metailurus major, and Felis sp.), one chalicothere (Ancylotherium sp.), one three-toed horse (Hipparion coelophyes), one deer (Dicrocerus sp.), one giraffid (Palaeotragus microdon), and three bovids (Sinotragus wimani, Tsaidamotherium hedini and Protoryx sp.). Of these, the combination of H. coelophyes, S. wimani, and Protoryx sp. strongly support a late Late Miocene age. Pollen analysis of the Liushu Formation showed that grasses increased significantly and became dominant, especially xerophilous and sub-xerophilous grasses, along with some broad leaves of temperate and warm temperate zones, suggesting that the vegetation of the Liushu Formation belonged to a subarid or arid steppe.

In Kazakhstan, Sinotherium zaisanensis is known from the Karabulak formation which dates to  6.3–6.5 Ma (Late Miocene). It coexisted with four caniforms (Martes sp., Promeles sp., Plesiogulo crassa Teilhard, Indarctos punjabiensis), three feliforms (Adcrocuta eximia, Hyaenictitherium hyaenoides orlovi, Amphimachairodus kurteni), three perissodactyls (Hipparion hippidiodus, H. elegans, Chilotherium sp.), and six artiodactyls (Cervavitus novorossiae, Procapreolus latifrons, Samotherium cf. irtyshense, Paleotragus (Yuorlovia) asiaticus, Tragoportax sp., Gazella dorcadoides). The climate that Sinotherium zaisanensis lived in was mild and arid. It was a habitat of wide, open steppes.

References

External links
"Elasmotherians- Evolution, Distribution, and Ecology" 
Mikko's Phylogeny Archive, "Rhinocerotidae: †Elasmotheriinae: †Elasmotheriini: †Elasmotheriina" 
New Remains of Paraelasmotherium (Perissodactyla. Rhinocerotidae) from the Miocene in Dongxiang Study. Gansu, China 

Miocene rhinoceroses
Neogene mammals of Asia
Pliocene rhinoceroses
Fossil taxa described in 1924
Miocene mammals of Asia
Pliocene mammals of Asia